The First Lok Sabha was constituted on 17 April 1952 after India's first general election. It completed its full tenure of five years and was dissolved on 4 April 1957. The year 1951 is often misleadingly associated with the election for first Lok Sabha. That is because polling for 3-4 constituencies was held in late 1951 before snow would cover that region. Polling for rest of the seats (97-98%) was conducted in December 1951 and January 1952, a few seats voted in February 1952, and Lok Sabha was constituted in April 1952. Ninety constituencies elected two members each, a practice that some constituencies followed even in 1957.

The official list of members, hosted on a site maintained by Government of India : http://www.elections.in/parliamentary-constituencies/1951-election-results.html

Keys

Single Seat Constituencies

Double Seat Constituencies

Triple Seat Constituencies

Assam

Bihar

Bombay

Madhya Pradesh

Madras

Orissa

Punjab

Uttar Pradesh

West Bengal

Hyderabad

Madhya Bharat

Mysore

Patiala and East Punjab States Union

Rajasthan

Saurashtra

Travancore Cochin

Ajmer

Bhopal

Bilaspur

Coorg

Delhi

Himachal Pradesh

Kutch

Manipur

Tripura

Vindhya Pradesh

Nominated

References

List
1